The rosters of all participating teams at the women's tournament of the 2013 Rugby World Cup Sevens.

Pool A

Coach:  John Tait
 Ghislaine Landry
 Kayla Moleschi
 Karen Paquin
 Kelly Russell
 Ashley Steacy
 Mandy Marchak
 Jen Kish (c)
 Arielle Dubissette-Borrice
 Bianca Farella
 Heather Moyse
 Magali Harvey
 Brittany Waters

Coach: Gareth Gilbert
 Joyce van Altena
 Linda Franssen (c)
 Inge Petra Visser
 Pien Selbeck
 Loraine Laros
 Bente Gelauff
 Kelly van Harskamp
 Anne Hielckert
 Johanna van Rossum
 Paula Schouten
 Nicole Kwee
 Dorien Eppink

Coach:  Sean Horan

 Linda Itunu
 Honey Hireme
 Vaine Greig
 Alexis Tapsell
 Sarah Goss
 Renee Wickcliffe
 Tyla Nathan-Wong
 Kelly Brazier
 Huriana Manuel (c)
 Selica Winiata
 Portia Woodman
 Kayla McAlister

Khouloud Gmir
 Rin el Haj Ali
 Ikhlas Abida
 Rawia Othmani
 Rihab Zorgati
 Donia Charfi
 Saoussen Dellagi
 Dorsaf Mahbouli
 Mariem Mekni
 Ines Souissi
 Ameni Gharbi
 Dhekra Khemili

Pool B

Shannon Parry
 Sharni Williams (c)
 Shontelle Stowers
 Saofaiga Saemo
 Nikki Etheridge
 Katrina Barker
 Tiana Penitani
 Iliseva Batibasaga
 Amy Turner
 Rebecca Tavo
 Emilee Cherry
 Charlotte Caslick

Sun Tingting
 Yao Jiyan
 Liu Tang
 Fan Wenjuan
 Chen Ming
 Liu Yan (c)
 Zhao Xinqi
 Ma Guoping
 Gong Guye
 Li Yuanyuan
 Tong Xueqin
 Chen Keyi

Coach:  Jon Skurr
 Jenny Murphy
 Claire Molloy
 Sophie Spence
 Jeanette Feighery
 Larissa Muldoon
 Lynne Cantwell
 Alison Miller
 Shannon Houston (c)
 Amy Davis
 Ashleigh Baxter
 Laura O'Mahony
 Nikki Caughey

Coach:  Denver Wannies
 Mandisa Williams (c)
 Benele Makwezela
 Nomaphelo Mayongo
 Zenay Jordaan
 Yolanda Meiring
 Lorinda Brown
 Phumeza Gadu
 Thami Faleni
 Fundiswa Plaatjie
 Mathrin Simmers
 Natasha Hofmeester
 Veroeshka Grain

Pool C

Juliana Esteves dos Santos
 Beatriz Futuro Muhlbauer
 Julia Albino Sarda
 Edna Santini
 Paula Ishibashi
 Tais Balconi
 Thais Rocha Cruz
 Angelica Gevaerd (c)
 Luiza Campos
 Maria Gabriela Avila
 Carla Neme Barbosa
 Mariana Barbosa Ramalho

Elina Ratauluva
 Siteri Drova Tabua
 Litia Naiqato
 Esiteri Rauca Bulikiobo
 Viniana Naisaluwaki Riwai
 Asinate Ufia Savu
 Rusila Nagasau (c)
 Talica Vodo
 Tavaita Rowati
 Suliana Batirau Gusuivalu
 Priscilla Sauvavi Siata
 Luisa Tisolo

Coach: Boris Gutierrez
 Berta García
 Paula Medín
 Ángela del Pan
 Marina Bravo
 Patricia García
 Marta Cabane
 Bárbara Plà
 Irene Schiavon
 Elisabet Martínez
 Vanessa Rial (c)
 María Casado
 María Ribera

Coach:  Ric Suggitt
 Jillion Potter
 Kelly Griffin
 Vanesha McGee (c)
 Deven Owsiany
 Kimber Rozier
 Christy Ringgenberg
 Victoria Folayan
 Kathryn Johnson
 Irene Gardner
 Emilie Bydwell
 Nathalie Marchino
 Ryan Carlyle

Pool D

Coach:  Barry Maddocks
 Claire Allan
 Heather Fisher
 Katherine Merchant
 Natasha Hunt
 Rachael Burford
 Katy McLean
 Emily Scarratt
 Marlie Packer
 Fran Matthews
 Alice Richardson
 Michaela Staniford (c)
 Joanne Watmore

Marjorie Mayans
 Camille Grassineau
 Koumiba Djossouvi
 Pauline Biscarat
 Laura Delas
 Fanny Horta (c)
 Caroline Ladagnous
 Anaïs Lagougine
 Jade Le Pesq
 Chloe Pelle
 Christelle Le Duff
 Shannon Izar

Chiharu Nakamura (c)
 Ayaka Suzuki
 Misaki Suzuki
 Kana Mitsugi
 Akari Fujisaki
 Makiko Tomita
 Noriko Taniguchi
 Yume Okuroda
 Yoko Suzuki
 Chisato Yokoo
 Marie Yamaguchi
 Chikami Inoue

Rusiet Edidzhi
 Anna Prib
 Ekatarina Kabeeva
 Svetlana Usatykh
 Baizat Khamidova
 Anna Malygina
 Marina Petrova
 Maria Titova
 Nadezda Kudinova (c)
 Ekaterina Kazakova
 Anastasiya Mukharyamova
 Ekaterina Bankerova

References

Rugby World Cup Sevens squads
Squads
World